Nuangola Outlet is a tributary of Little Wapwallopen Creek in Luzerne County, Pennsylvania, in the United States. Wisconsinan Till and bedrock consisting of sandstone, shale, conglomerate, and coal occur in the watershed. There are also several lakes and patches of wetland. The stream was observed to have "excellent" water quality in the 1970s.

Course

Nuangola Outlet begins in Nuangola Lake in Rice Township, a few hundred feet east of the border between Rice Township and Nuangola. It flows east for a few tenths of a mile, passing through one lake and entering another lake. From the southern end of the second lake, the stream flows south and passes through two more small lakes after a few tenths of a mile. It then crosses Interstate 81 and turns southeast and then east. After a short distance, the stream reaches its confluence with Little Wapwallopen Creek.

Geography and geology

Nuangola Outlet is situated just south of Penobscot Knob.

Most of the surficial geology in the vicinity of Nuangola Outlet consists of a glacial or resedimented till known as Wisconsinan Till. However, bedrock consisting of sandstone, conglomerate, shale, and coal also occurs near the stream, especially on Penobscot Mountain.

Watershed
The stream is entirely within the United States Geological Survey quadrangle of Wilkes-Barre West.

A wastewater treatment plant with a capacity of 87,500 gallons per day discharges into Little Wapwallopen Creek through Nuangola Outlet. The treatment plant is operated by Wilbar Realty and serves 176 homes in the Laurel Lake Village housing development.

There are a number of lakes in the watershed of Nuangola Outlet, one of which is Nuangola Lake. Nuangola Lake has an area of approximately 97 acres. There are also several wetlands in the watershed.

History
Nuangola Outlet was entered into the Geographic Names Information System on August 2, 1979. Its identifier in the Geographic Names Information System is 1193052.

In the 1970s, Nuangola Outlet was observed to have "excellent" water quality.

Biology
The trout populations of Nuangola Outlet have been reduced by more than 50 percent.

See also
Pond Creek (Little Wapwallopen Creek), next tributary of Little Wapwallopen Creek going downstream
List of rivers of Pennsylvania

References

External links
Map of Nuangola Outlet

Rivers of Luzerne County, Pennsylvania
Tributaries of the Susquehanna River
Rivers of Pennsylvania